Harpalus pallipes is a species of ground beetle in the subfamily Harpalinae. It was described by Chaudoir in 1837.

References

pallipes
Beetles described in 1837